The patronal feast of Saint Francis and Saint Catherine is a religious and civil celebration annually held on 4 October in Italy and other locations influenced by Christianity.

Patronage 
Francis

Catherine

Feast day 

His patronal feast is also celebrated in Somerville, Massachusetts (United States); in Yucuaquín (El Salvador); in Bucalemu (Chile); in Huamachuco (Peru); in Panajachel, Sololá, and San Francisco, Petén (Guatemala); in Tlalcilalcalpan and Valle de Bravo, Mexico; in Tonalá, Chiapas; in Acachuén and Tzintzuntzan, Michoacán (Mexico).

World Animal Day

On the same date
On 4 October 1970, Pope Paul VI named Catherine a Doctor of the Church; this title was almost simultaneously given to Teresa of Ávila (27 September 1970), making them the first women to receive this honour.

Notes and references

Notes

References 

Public holidays in Italy
 
Francis and Catherine
Francis of Assisi